The Dunlop Cup was a series of annual professional golf tournaments held in Australia from 1930 to 1952. Four separate events were held each year, in New South Wales, South Australia, Queensland and Victoria. The tournaments were sponsored by Dunlop Perdriau Rubber Co., later renamed Dunlop Rubber Australia.

History
Initially all four tournaments were played as match-play events over four days. There was a 36-hole stroke-play stage with the leading 8 playing 36-hole match-play. Later some states changed the format to 72-hole stroke-play over two days and later to 36 holes in a single day. After World War II, all events were contested as 36 holes of stroke-play on one day.

Ossie Walker won the Queensland event six times, matched by Ossie Pickworth who won the South Australian event six times in succession, although once he was a joint winner. Bruce Auld, Eric Cremin and Reg Want each won the event four times.

Winners

New South Wales

Queensland

South Australia

Victoria

References

Golf tournaments in Australia
Golf in New South Wales
Golf in South Australia
Golf in Queensland
Golf in Victoria (Australia)
Recurring sporting events established in 1930
Recurring sporting events disestablished in 1952
1930 establishments in Australia
1952 disestablishments in Australia